The Saṃyukta Nikāya ("Connected Discourses" or "Kindred Sayings") is a Buddhist scriptures collection, the third of the five Nikāyas, or collections, in the Sutta Pitaka, which is one of the "three baskets" that compose the Pali Tipitaka of Theravada Buddhism.  Because of the abbreviated way parts of the text are written, the total number of suttas/sūtras is unclear. The editor of the Pali Text Society edition of the text made it 2889, Bodhi in his translation has 2904, while the commentaries give 7762. A study by Rupert Gethin gives the totals for the Burmese and Sinhalese editions as 2854 and 7656, respectively, and his own calculation as 6696; he also says the total in the Thai edition is unclear. The suttas/sūtras are grouped into five vargas/vaggas, or sections. Each varga/vagga is further divided into samyuttas/saṃyuktas, or chapters, each of which in turn contains a group of suttas/sūtras on a related topic.

Correspondence with the Saṃyukta Āgama

The Samyutta Nikaya corresponds to the Saṃyukta Āgama found in the Sutra Pitikas of various Sanskritic early Buddhists schools, fragments of which survive in Sanskrit and in Tibetan translation. A complete Chinese translation from the Sarvāstivādin recension appears in the Chinese Buddhist canon, where it is known as the Zá Āhánjīng (雜阿含經); meaning "the mixed agama". A comparison of the Sarvāstivādin, Kāśyapīya, and Theravadin texts reveals a considerable consistency of content, although each recension contains sutras/suttas not found in the others.  The Collation and Annotation of Saṃyuktāgama (《<雜阿含經>校釋》,Chinese version) makes further comparison.

Dating
Bhante Sujato, a contemporary scholar monk, argues that the remarkable congruence of the various recensions suggests that the Samyutta Nikaya/Saṃyukta Āgama was the only collection to be finalized in terms of both structure and content in the pre-sectarian period.

Translations

Full translations 

The Book of the Kindred Sayings, tr C. A. F. Rhys Davids & F. L. Woodward, 1917–30, 5 volumes, Bristol: Pali Text Society
The Connected Discourses of the Buddha, tr Bhikkhu Bodhi, 2000, Wisdom Publications, Somerville, MA, ; the Pali Text Society also issues a private edition of this for members only, which is its preferred translation
Bhikkhu Sujato (trans.), The “Linked” or “Connected” Discourses, 2018, published online at SuttaCentral and released into the public domain.

Selections

 anthology published by Buddhist Publication Society, Kandy, Sri Lanka
 Nidana Samyutta, published in Burma; reprinted Sri Satguru, Delhi

Divisions

The vaggas contained in this nikaya are (the numbering of chapters [samyuttas] here refers to the PTS and Burmese editions; the Sinhalese and Thai editions divide the text up somewhat differently):

See also

 Anguttara Nikaya
 Early Buddhist Texts
 Digha Nikaya
 Khuddaka Nikaya
 Majjhima Nikaya
 Pāli Canon
 Sutta Piṭaka
 Supaṇṇa Saṃyutta
 Ādittapariyāya Sutta
 Anattalakkhaṇa Sutta
 Dhammacakkappavattana Sutta

Notes

Bibliography
 Bhikkhu Bodhi (trans.) (2000). The Connected Discourses of the Buddha: A Translation of the Saṃyutta Nikāya. Boston: Wisdom Publications. .
 Digital Dictionary of Buddhism, entry on Zá Ahánjīng
 The Collation and Annotation of Saṃyuktāgama《<雜阿含經>校釋》,(Chinese version). Wang Jianwei and Jin Hui, East China Normal University Press, 2014.

External links

 Saṃyutta Nikāya at suttacentral.net
 Samyutta Nikaya suttas in Pali (complete) and English (first 44 chapters) at "Metta Net" 
 Samyutta Nikaya selected suttas in English at "Access to Insight"

Theravada Buddhist texts
 
Pali Buddhist texts